The Netherlands were represented in the Eurovision Song Contest 1957 by Corry Brokken with the song "" written by Guus Jansen and Willy van Hemert. The Dutch entry was chosen during a national final called  and the country would go on to win the Eurovision Song Contest.

Before Eurovision

Nationaal Songfestival 1957 

Like in the previous year, a national final titled  was held with eight songs competing. Again, the show was hosted by Karin Kraaykamp. Four singers took part in the selection, each of them presenting two songs. The winner was again chosen by postcard voting, however, this time, only the top four entries were announced. Corry Brokken, who was already one of the two Dutch representatives in the 1956 Eurovision Song Contest, was the clear winner of the national final, as her entries finished first and second. Marcel Thielemans finished third and fourth, but far behind her. The winning song was "" and would be the third Dutch entry in the Eurovision Song Contest.

It can be seen that the interest in the contest had increased a lot: in 1956, a total of 6,694 postcards were counted, fewer than only the winning one received in 1957, which got 6,927; the top four received a total of postcards of 14,858 postcards.

Releases 
"" was released on an EP by Corry Brokken with the title "Grand Prix 1957 Eurovision". The entry itself did not reach the Dutch single charts and was also not an international hit although it would win the Eurovision Song Contest. Brokken has also recorded a German version ("") and a French version ("") of the song. None of the other songs in the national final made any commercial impact.

At Eurovision 
At the Eurovision Song Contest in Frankfurt, the Dutch entry was performed sixth on the night following Austria with "" and preceding Germany with "". Corry Brokken was backed by violinist Sem Nijveen, who had a remarkable long solo part. The Dutch conductor at the contest was Dolf van der Linden. The Netherlands won the Eurovision Song Contest. At the close of voting, the Dutch entry had received 31 points and at least one point from every other country. It would be the clearest victory ever in this voting system as they got 31% of all votes and 34.4% of the votes possible to be received (as no country can vote for itself). Furthermore, in the voting system of that year, it would be the only entry ever to receive points from every other country and one of only two to lead on the scoreboard from the first until the last vote. The Netherlands would be the only country to win the contest on its second attempt until Ukraine did so in 2004.

Voting 
Every country had a jury of ten people. Every jury member could give one point to his or her favourite song.

Trivia

 Despite winning the Eurovision Song Contest, according to Dutch newspaper , "" stood no chance.

Sources 
delootsbod.dk
Information about the national final

References 

1957
Countries in the Eurovision Song Contest 1957
Eurovision